Lac-Lenôtre is an unorganized territory in the Outaouais region of Quebec, Canada. It is one of the five unorganized territories in the La Vallée-de-la-Gatineau Regional County Municipality. It is named after Lake Lenôtre.

Demographics
Population trend:
 Population in 2011: 0
 Population in 2006: 0
 Population in 2001: 0

References

Unorganized territories in Outaouais